Superfly is the debut studio album by Japanese band Superfly released on May 14, 2008. Approximately 391,182 copies have been sold in Japan and is certified Double Platinum by the RIAJ for the shipment of 500,000 copies. On the iTunes Store, a special remix of "Manifesto" by Ram Rider was included.

Superfly debuted at number 1 on the Oricon's weekly album charts; the last time a female artist had their first album debut at number 1 was Tina's Colorado in 1999.

Track listing

Charts (Japan)

References

2008 albums
Superfly (band) albums
Warner Music Japan albums